Pupendo is a 2003 Czech comedy drama film directed by Jan Hřebejk

Plot 
Pupendo shows the difficulty of life in Czechoslovakia during the 1980s. Artist Bedřich Mára (Bolek Polivka) is unable to find much secure work due to his public antagonism toward the ruling Communist Party. He has a wife and two children. Life begins to change when art historian Alois Fábera (Jiři Pecha) begins working on a piece about Bedřich, leading to a job offer from a Party official. Things are looking up, until the wrong people hear portions of the historian's writing.

Cast 
 Bolek Polívka - Bedrich Mára
 Eva Holubová - Alena Márová
 Jaroslav Dušek - Míla Brecka
 Jiří Pecha - Alois Fábera
 Vilma Cibulková - Magda Brecková
 Lukáš Baborský - Matěj Mára

References

External links

2003 films
Czech comedy-drama films
2000s Czech-language films
Films directed by Jan Hřebejk
Czech Lion Awards winners (films)
Golden Kingfisher winners
2000s Czech films